Gianmarco Lucchesi (born 10 September 2000) is an Italian professional rugby union player who primarily plays hooker for Benetton of the United Rugby Championship.

Professional career 
Lucchesi has previously played for clubs such as Gran Ducato in the past. Initially he was named as Permit Player for the last part of 2019–20 Pro14 season and 2020–21 Pro14 season, but he was immediately became a full time player in the Benetton squad.

In January 2020, Lucchesi was named in the Italy Under 20 squad for the 2020 Six Nations Under 20s Championship. From October 2020 he is also part of Italy squad, having made his test debut against Ireland during the 2020 Six Nations Championship.

References

External links 

2000 births
Living people
Benetton Rugby players
Italian rugby union players
Italy international rugby union players
Rugby union hookers